The third season of the American teen drama television series Gossip Girl premiered on The CW on September 14, 2009, and concluded on May 17, 2010, consisting of 22 episodes. Based on the novel series of the same name by Cecily von Ziegesar, the series was developed for television by Josh Schwartz and Stephanie Savage. The season premiered with 2.55 million viewers and a 1.4 Adults 18-49 rating, up 14% in viewers from its season two finale.

Overall, the season attracted an average of 2.02 million viewers tuning in each week, with a 1.1 rating in Adult 18–49.

Synopsis 
High school is officially over for Blair, Serena, Nate, Chuck, Dan, and Vanessa as they leave their carefree days behind and start the new chapter in their life: Adulthood. Still at Constance for their junior year, Jenny and Eric's friendship is tested as Jenny starts her duties as the new Queen of Constance. Serena and Blair's friendship also gets tested as they grow and mature. Chuck and Blair are finally in a committed relationship but start question if it will work without any mind games. Serena and Nate's friendship begins to grow closer, and the same goes for Dan and Vanessa.

Cast and characters

Main cast
 Blake Lively as Serena van der Woodsen
 Leighton Meester as Blair Waldorf
 Penn Badgley as Dan Humphrey
 Chace Crawford as Nate Archibald
 Taylor Momsen as Jenny Humphrey
 Ed Westwick as Chuck Bass
 Jessica Szohr as Vanessa Abrams
 Kelly Rutherford as Lily Humphrey
 Matthew Settle as Rufus Humphrey
 Kristen Bell as Gossip Girl (uncredited)

Recurring cast
 Joanna Garcia as Bree Buckley
 Connor Paolo as Eric van der Woodsen
 Chris Riggi as Scott Rosson
 Sebastian Stan as Carter Baizen
 Aaron Schwartz as Vanya
 Michelle Trachtenberg as Georgina Sparks
 Zuzanna Szadkowski as Dorota Kishlovsky
 Hilary Duff as Olivia Burke
 Matt Doyle as Jonathan Whitney
 Holley Fain as Maureen van der Bilt
 Aaron Tveit as Tripp van der Bilt III
 Kevin Zegers as Damien Dalgaard
 Margaret Colin as Eleanor Waldorf
 Caroline Lagerfelt as CeCe Rhodes
 Laura Harring as Elizabeth Fisher
 Sherri Saum as Holland Kemble
 Desmond Harrington as Jack Bass
 Wallace Shawn as Cyrus Rose

Guest cast
 Ashley Hinshaw as herself
 Tyra Banks as Ursula Nyquist
 Sonic Youth as themselves
 Gina Torres as Gabriela Abrams
 Albert Hammond Jr. as himself
 Lady Gaga as herself
 Robert John Burke as Bart Bass
 Willa Holland as Agnes Andrews
 Luke Kleintank as Elliot Leichter
 William Baldwin as William van der Woodsen

Episodes

Ratings
The third season premiere was watched by 2.55 million viewers, with a rating and share of 1.7/3 in households and 1.4/3 in the 18-49 demographic. 

In the Live + DVR Ratings the series has a larger increase. The third episode of the season, "The Lost Boy", in its original airing, it was watched by 2.36 million viewers, but with the DVR Ratings the episode scores nearly 3.0 million viewers. The fifth episode was watched by 2.36 million viewers on live broadcast, but with the DVR ratings, the episode scores 2.94 million viewers.

This is the least-watched season to date, with an average of 2.02 million viewers tuning in each week and a 1.1 rating in Adult 18–49, which was down 18% in total viewers from the previous season's 2.48 million, but up 0.2 in Adults 18-49.

DVD release

References

External links
 List of Gossip Girl season 3 episodes on IMDb

2009 American television seasons
2010 American television seasons